École normale or École Normale may refer to:
 École normale supérieure (Paris), called École normal until 1846, a university-level institution
 Normal school, English translation of French , typically designating a teacher-training school 
 École normale supérieure (disambiguation), bodies derived from the Paris institution
 École Normale de Musique de Paris, a music conservatory
 École normale catholique, or lycée Blomet, a private secondary school in Paris
 École Normale Hébraïque, a Jewish secondary school in Casablanca, Morocco

See also
 Grande école, a class of prestigious specialised universities in France